Eupithecia viduata is a moth in the family Geometridae. It is found in Peru.

The wingspan is about 27 mm. The forewings are blackish grey. The hindwings are paler and more transparent towards the costa.

References

Moths described in 1907
viduata
Moths of South America